An uezd (also spelled uyezd), or povit in a Ukrainian context, or Kreis in Baltic-German context, was a type of administrative subdivision of the Grand Duchy of Moscow, the Tsardom of Russia, the Russian Empire, the Russian SFSR, and the early Soviet Union, which was in use from the 13th century. For most of Russian history, uezds were a second-level administrative division. By sense, but not by etymology, uezd approximately corresponds to the English "county".

General description
Originally describing groups of several volosts, they formed around the most important cities. Uezds were ruled by the appointees (namestniki) of a knyaz and, starting from the 17th century, by voyevodas.

In 1708, an administrative reform was carried out by Peter the Great, dividing Russia into governorates. The subdivision into uyezds was abolished at that time but was reinstated in 1727, as a result of Catherine I's administrative reform.

By the Soviet administrative reform of 1923–1929, most of the uezds were transformed into raions (districts). In Ukraine, uezds were reformed into forty okruhas which were the primary-level of administrative division from 1925 to 1930.

Baltic governorates 
In the Baltic governorates the type of division was known as Kreis.

Bessarabia
The uezds of Bessarabia Governorate were called Ținut or Județ in Romanian, which would translate as "county".

Ukraine
The Ukrainian word for uezd is povit (plural ), also called powiat under Polish administration.

See also
List of uezds of the Russian Empire
History of the administrative division of Russia
Gubernia

External links
 "Administrative territorial division of Russia in the 18th-20th centuries" («Административно-территориальное деление России XVIII—XX веков») "Otechestvennye Zapiski", No.6, 2002.
 Тархов, Сергей, "Изменение административно-территориального деления России в XIII-XX в." ( pdf), Логос, #1 2005 (46), 

Subdivisions of the Russian Empire
Local government in the Russian Empire
Types of administrative division
Russian-language designations of territorial entities